is the second season of the Japanese animated television series Bakugan Battle Brawlers. It premiered in Canada on April 12, 2009, on Teletoon and in the United States on May 9, 2009, on Cartoon Network (Also airing on Disney XD as well). The series started airing on Cartoon Network in the United Kingdom on January 4, 2010. In Japan it airs on the TV Tokyo Network, starting on March 2, 2010. It is split into two arcs, but are linked to the season's story.

After an original order of 26 episodes, they revealed in the next time credits of episode 26 that the series was extended by Teletoon and Cartoon Network to be 52 episodes. Most of the episodes originally premiered in North America on Teletoon except for episodes 27 through 29, 33 through 35, and episode 43, which premiered on the Cartoon Network.

Episode list

References 
 General

 
 

 Specific

External links
 TV Tokyo's Bakugan: New Vestroia website 
 Nelvana's Bakugan: New Vestroia website

2009 Canadian television seasons
2010 Canadian television seasons
New Vestroia
2009 Japanese television seasons
2010 Japanese television seasons